The 2007 Saudi Crown Prince Cup Final was the 32nd final of the Crown Prince Cup, Saudi Arabia's main football knock-out competition at the time.

It took place on 27 April 2007 at the Prince Abdullah Al Faisal Stadium in Jeddah, Saudi Arabia and was contested between city rivals Al-Ittihad and Al-Ahli. It was Al-Ahli's tenth Crown Prince Cup final and Al-Ittihad's 11th. This was the fourth meeting between these two clubs in the final. 

Al-Ahli won the game 2–1 to secure their fifth title and first since 2002. As winners of the 2006–07 Saudi Crown Prince Cup, Al-Ahli qualified for the 2008 AFC Champions League group stage.

Teams

Venue
The Prince Abdullah Al Faisal Stadium in Jeddah was announced as the host of the final. This was the ninth Crown Prince Cup final to be hosted in the Prince Abdullah Al Faisal Stadium following those in 1991, 1993, 1995, 1996, 1997, 2000, 2001, and 2002.

The Prince Abdullah Al Faisal Stadium was opened in 1970 and was known as the Youth Welfare Stadium until 2001. The stadium was used as a venue for the 1989 FIFA World Youth Championship and hosted the final of the 2000–01 Asian Cup Winners' Cup. The stadium was used by the Saudi Arabia national football team, Al-Ahli, and Al-Ittihad, and hosted major domestic matches. The stadium underwent major construction in 2012 with plans to expand the number of seats and as of 2019 is still under construction.

Background
Al-Ittihad reached their 11th final after a 4–2 aggregate win against Al-Ettifaq. This was Al-Ittihad's first final since 2004 when they defeated Al-Ahli 1–0.

Al-Ahli reached their ninth final, after a 3–1 aggregate win against Al-Hilal. They finished as runners-up in the previous season, losing to Al-Hilal.

This was the twelfth meeting between the two sides in the Crown Prince Cup with Al-Ahli and Al-Ittihad winning five times each and one draw between them occurred. The two teams met three times in the final with Al-Ittihad winning twice in 1958 and 2004, and Al-Ahli won the 2002 final. The two teams played each other twice in the season prior to the final, once in the league and once in the Federation Cup final. Al-Ahli defeated Al-Ittihad 3–0 in the final to win their fifth Federation Cup and Al-Ittihad won the league match 3–0.

Road to the final 

Key: (H) = Home; (A) = Away

Match

Details

See also

2006–07 Saudi Crown Prince Cup
2006–07 Saudi Premier League
2008 AFC Champions League

References

External links

Sports competitions in Saudi Arabia
April 2007 sports events in Asia
Ittihad FC matches
Al-Ahli Saudi FC matches